Derek Martin Bell (born 30 October 1956 in Wyberton, Lincolnshire) was an English footballer who played for Lincoln City football club.

An apprentice with Derby County, he started his professional career with Halifax Town. Bell had a brief loan with Sheffield Wednesday before moving to Barnsley. After one season at Oakwell he was signed by Lincoln City for a record fee of £34,000. In his first season with the Imps, he scored 20 goals in 46 games. At the beginning of his second season he broke his leg, which then leg to a succession of injury problems.

Bell left Lincoln City in 1983, moving to Chesterfield for £8,500. He then drifted through lower league football with (amongst others) Boston United, Spalding United and Lincoln United.

External links
 
 Brief Biography

1956 births
Living people
English footballers
People from Wyberton
Association football forwards
Derby County F.C. players
Halifax Town A.F.C. players
Sheffield Wednesday F.C. players
Barnsley F.C. players
Lincoln City F.C. players
Chesterfield F.C. players
Scunthorpe United F.C. players
Boston United F.C. players
Spalding United F.C. players
Lincoln United F.C. players
English Football League players